Javier Alejandro Mascherano (born 8 June 1984) is an Argentine professional football coach and former player. As a player, he played as a centre-back or defensive midfielder, most notably for Liverpool, Barcelona and the Argentina national team.

Mascherano began his career at River Plate, where he earned his first senior honours, the Argentine Primera División, in 2003–04. He moved to Brazilian side Corinthians in 2005, winning the Brazilian Série A in his first season. Mascherano then moved to Europe, signing for Premier League side West Ham United, but his brief time at the club was blighted by unusual contract terms with Global Soccer Agencies. At the beginning of 2007, he joined Liverpool on loan, reaching the final of the UEFA Champions League, before he signed with the club for £18.7 million. After three years playing for Liverpool, Mascherano joined Barcelona in 2010, where he changed his position of defensive midfielder to full central defender. With Barcelona, he won five La Liga championships, two UEFA Champions League titles, and two FIFA Club World Cups, among other honours.

Mascherano made 147 appearances for the Argentina national team and is the second most capped player in the country's history (after Lionel Messi). From his debut in 2003 until his retirement in 2018, he represented the nation at five Copa América tournaments, finishing runner-up in 2004, 2007, 2015, and 2016, and four FIFA World Cups, reaching the 2014 final. He twice won a gold medal at the Summer Olympics, in 2004 and 2008, becoming the first male footballer to achieve this double feat since Hungarian defender Dezső Novák in 1968. Between 2008 and 2011, Mascherano served as the captain of Argentina.

Club career

River Plate
Born in San Lorenzo, Santa Fe, Mascherano came through the youth ranks at River Plate in Buenos Aires, Argentina. However, before making his club debut he made his name representing Argentina.

Mascherano won his first silverware when River won the 2003–04 Clausura championship. In the 2004 Copa Libertadores River reached the semi-final, but lost on penalties to arch-rivals Boca Juniors. Around this time several clubs including Real Madrid, and Deportivo La Coruña declared an interest in signing Mascherano, but River Plate turned down all offers, saying that none of the interested parties were prepared to pay enough.

2004–05 was not a successful season for River, finishing third in the Apertura Championship and only tenth in the Clausura. In the Copa Libertadores River again lost in the semi-final, this time to São Paulo. After the Confederations Cup in Germany, Brazilian club Corinthians acquired Mascherano from River Plate for US$15 million.

Corinthians
The Brazilian Série A runs from April, so Mascherano joined Corinthians in mid-season. After playing only nine games for his new club, in September 2005, Mascherano suffered a stress fracture to his left foot causing him to miss the end of the season. He returned to Argentina to be operated on by the national team doctor and recuperate. Corinthians, however, still claimed the 2005 Série A championship with the team captained by Mascherano's Argentine compatriot, Carlos Tevez.

In total, Mascherano was out of action for six months, only returning on 5 March 2006. Corinthians were forced to start their 2006 Copa Libertadores without Mascherano, but he returned in time for the Round of 16 tie against River Plate, which Corinthians lost. The 2006 Brazilian Série A also went badly for Corinthians, and at one stage they were battling against relegation. In June, the league season was interrupted for the 2006 World Cup.

Although his performance drew the attention of European clubs, he stated his desire to remain with Corinthians to help with the relegation battle, and postponed any transfer until January at the earliest. Hours before the northern summer 2006 transfer window closed, however, Mascherano joined West Ham United for an undisclosed fee, along with teammate Carlos Tevez.

West Ham United
During the summer of 2006, Mascherano was linked with top clubs around Europe; he stated he would relish playing in Spain for Real Madrid or Barcelona, but eventually signed for West Ham United in the English Premier League alongside Carlos Tevez. Mascherano holds an Italian passport due to his ancestry from Sicily.

The move to West Ham was seen as surprising, with many of Europe's top clubs having been linked with Mascherano all summer. There were many rumours about the nature of the transfer, primarily regarding Media Sports Investment's interest in buying-out West Ham. Rumours included speculation as to whether West Ham truly owned the players, or whether a third party held their registration, and also that if a high enough (£112 million was touted) offer was received West Ham would be forced to sell. (It has since been discovered that Mystere Services and Global Soccer Agencies are the companies that owned Mascherano.)

Before Mascherano joined, West Ham had won one game, drawn one and lost one. Upon his arrival, however, the team went into free-fall, losing eight games and drawing one game in all competitions before their next win on 29 October. During this time, Mascherano rarely featured in the team despite their struggles, prompting rumours about financial clauses related to the amount of time he actually played. In October, Argentina national coach Alfio Basile stated that he hoped Mascherano would leave West Ham "as soon as possible", and, "I hope for God's sake that Mascherano can go to Juventus."

On 16 January 2007, Liverpool requested clearance from FIFA to take Mascherano on loan from West Ham. FIFA's rules state that no player can play for more than two clubs between 1 July and 30 June the following year as Mascherano had already played for both Corinthians and West Ham during this time.

FIFA approved the deal on 31 January 2007. However, although Liverpool submitted his registration details before the midnight transfer deadline, the Premier League did not immediately announce whether it would allow Mascherano to play for Liverpool, saying that it wanted to "take time to satisfy itself with the proposed arrangements".

In a further development, it was announced on 2 March that the Premier League were charging West Ham with breaking rule B13, concerning acting in good faith, and rule U18, which concerns the influence of third-party ownership. On 27 April, the Premier League issued West Ham a world-record fine of £5.5 million.

Liverpool

On 10 February 2007, Liverpool added Mascherano to their UEFA Champions League squad and gave him the number 20 shirt. Eventually, on 20 February 2007, Mascherano's move to Liverpool became official after the Premier League accepted Liverpool's request to register the player at Anfield.

Mascherano made his debut for Liverpool against Sheffield United on 24 February 2007, and was praised by the Liverpool manager Rafael Benítez and team captain Steven Gerrard after Liverpool's 4–0 victory. After playing in a match against Arsenal on 31 March, Benítez called Mascherano a "monster of a player". Similarly, his teammates were impressed by his talent; Xabi Alonso noted how mature a player he was for his age, saying, "He has a cool mind on the pitch. He is analysing and thinking about the game in each moment." Mascherano's first Champions League appearance came in the quarter-final first leg away to PSV Eindhoven on 3 April. Hastily establishing himself as a starter at the club, Mascherano played in the Champions League Final that year against Milan. He and teammate Alonso were successful in stifling the creative play of both Kaká and Clarence Seedorf for much of the match but Liverpool eventually succumbed to Milan, losing 2–1 at the Olympic Stadium in Athens. He was voted Liverpool's man of the match by the fans on the official Liverpool website.

Following months of speculation, Mascherano signed a four-year permanent contract with Liverpool on 29 February 2008, ending his association with Media Sports Investments. The transfer reportedly cost Liverpool £18.6 million, and covered not only the transfer fee, but also the player's wages for the four-year deal. It was allowed to go through immediately as Mascherano was not contracted to another club, making him exempt from the rules of the transfer window. He scored his first Premier League and Liverpool goal on 15 March 2008, with a 20-yard strike against Reading.

On 29 November 2009, Mascherano claimed the first goal in the 2–0 win against Everton at Goodison Park when his 30-yard shot appeared to be heading just off target before it took a wicked deflection off Joseph Yobo before finding the net. The goal officially went down as an own goal. In a match against Portsmouth on 19 December 2009, Mascherano was sent off for committing a bad foul on Tal Ben Haim. It was later confirmed that the sending off meant a four-match suspension for Mascherano. This was due to this being his second red card of the season, Liverpool went on to lose the match 2–0. Mascherano had the worst disciplinary record of the 2009–10 Premier League season with seven yellow cards and two red. He scored his first goal of the season with a bullet of a shot from outside the area in the UEFA Europa League against Unirea Urziceni away from home in a match Liverpool won 3–1 to secure their place in the round of 16 of the competition with an aggregate win of 4–1.

On 27 July 2010, after returning from a break after the 2010 World Cup, Mascherano informed new Liverpool manager Roy Hodgson that he wanted to leave the club. During that break, Hodgson had failed with several attempts to contact Mascherano, able only to leave messages for him saying that he was looking forward to meeting him back on Merseyside as his calls went unreturned.

Mascherano was held in high esteem by the Liverpool fans, who gave him his own song, (to the tune of the White Stripes' "Seven Nation Army"). After winning the 2011 Champions League Final with Barcelona against Manchester United, Mascherano, speaking directly after the match, said, "I want to say, I know that Liverpool supporters, after my exit, I know they were a little bit sad with me—this is for them as well."

Liverpool announced on 27 August that they had agreed a £17.25 million transfer fee with Barcelona for the player and had given permission for him to speak with the Spanish club.

2008 Old Trafford incident
In his first game at Old Trafford against Manchester United on 23 March 2008, Mascherano was sent off after collecting two yellow cards. He was initially booked for a late tackle on Paul Scholes, and later dismissed for running towards referee Steve Bennett to protest a yellow card shown to Fernando Torres. Mascherano had to be pushed from the field of play by Steven Gerrard and Xabi Alonso. Rafael Benítez was forced to leave the dugout and plead with Mascherano to leave the field, and he was escorted down the tunnel by Peter Crouch. The Football Association ruled that the usual one-game suspension be increased to three games for improper conduct. Mascherano admitted the improper conduct charge levelled at him, but appealed against the further two-to-three-match suspension. This appeal was denied by the FA, however, and Mascherano was also fined £15,000; he demanded that this fine would be paid to a charity.

With the controversial incident behind him, Mascherano would play a role in Liverpool's 2–1 win over Manchester United at Anfield on 13 September 2008, although he was at fault for failing to cover countryman Carlos Tevez, who scored for United less than three minutes into the game. Mascherano made amends for his mistake, and was instrumental in creating the goal which put Liverpool 2–1 up. Mascherano was voted Man of the Match by the fans on Liverpool's official website.

Barcelona

On 28 August 2010, Mascherano agreed terms on a four-year deal contract with Barcelona for €24 million. On 30 August 2010, Mascherano passed his medical to complete his transfer to Barça, and told Barça TV, "The truth is it's a dream, it's a great joy." He made his league debut on 11 September 2010, starting in a 0–2 home defeat against recently promoted Hércules, marking the first defeat at the Camp Nou in 16 months. Mascherano had a mixed season at the Camp Nou, spending the first half of the season mainly coming off the bench but for the latter part playing out of position in a centre-back role. On 28 May 2011, Mascherano started alongside Gerard Piqué in the 2011 Champions League final against Manchester United at the Wembley Stadium. Barcelona went on to win the game 3–1, with Mascherano dedicating the win to Liverpool fans, some of which he had upset during his move. In the run to the final, Mascherano denied Arsenal's Nicklas Bendtner a certain goal with a sliding tackle towards the end of the second leg of the round of 16 match, with the Catalan side beating the Gunners 3–1, 4–3 on aggregate.

In his second season, Mascherano played almost exclusively as a centre back, putting in consistent performances starting regularly for the team in defence.

On 26 July 2012, Mascherano signed a contract extension with Barcelona, keeping him with the Catalan giants until 2016. His buyout clause was set at €100 million. On 7 June 2014, Mascherano signed an extension on his contract, tying him to the Catalan club until 2018 and keeping his buyout clause at €100 million.

On 6 June 2015, Mascherano started in the 2015 Champions League final, as the club won its fifth Champions League title by defeating Juventus 3-1 at Berlin's Olympiastadion. This made Barcelona the first club in history to win the treble of domestic league, domestic cup and European Cup/Champions League twice.

Upon club captain Xavi's departure in 2015, Mascherano was named the 4th captain of Barcelona for the 2015-16 season behind Andrés Iniesta, Lionel Messi and Sergio Busquets. On 27 July 2016, Mascherano signed a new contract with Barcelona, which would keep him at the club until 2019.

On 26 April 2017, Mascherano scored his first and only goal for Barcelona, a penalty kick in a La Liga match against Osasuna.

On 23 January 2018, Barcelona announced that Mascherano would leave the club after seven and a half seasons.

Hebei China Fortune
On 24 January 2018, Chinese Super League side Hebei China Fortune announced the signing of Mascherano for €5.5 million, which would be effective 2 days later. He scored his first goal for the club in a Chinese FA Cup match against Shandong Luneng Taishan on 2 May 2018.

Estudiantes
On 23 November 2019, it was announced that Mascherano would be joining Argentine club Estudiantes in January 2020 on a free transfer. He made his official debut in a league match against San Lorenzo on 25 January 2020, which ended in a 1–1 draw.

On 15 November 2020, Mascherano announced his retirement as a professional footballer.

International career
Mascherano’s first international appearance came in 2001. September of that year saw him play on the Argentina team that finished fourth in the 2001 FIFA U-17 World Championship. In June 2003 he played in the Toulon Tournament, where he was named the best player of the competition as Argentina under-20 finished 3rd.

Mascherano's impact at youth levels was such that he made his senior international debut before playing a single minute for River Plate's first team (due to his central midfield position at club level being occupied by River’s long standing captain Leonardo Astrada, nicknamed the Chief). That international debut came in a friendly against Uruguay on 16 July 2003.

Halfway through the 2003–04 Apertura championship, Mascherano was called up to play in the 2003 FIFA World Youth Championship. Argentina again finished fourth with Mascherano the team's outstanding player. He was however suspended for the third place play-off.

In January 2004, Mascherano joined up with Argentina U23 for the South American Pre-Olímpico tournament in Chile. Argentina won the tournament, thereby qualifying for the 2004 Summer Olympics. In August, Mascherano and the team went on to become gold medal-winners in Greece.

At the end of the 2003–04 season, Mascherano was included in the Argentina senior squad for the 2004 Copa América. Argentina lost to Brazil on penalties in the final, but Mascherano impressed enough to be voted Argentina's player of the tournament by his teammates.

In the 2006 World Cup, Mascherano played every minute of every match for Argentina, with the team being eliminated by Germany in the quarter-finals.

His first two goals for the senior Argentina team came in July 2007 during the 2007 Copa América. On 5 July, he scored the only goal in Argentina's final group stage match against Paraguay, which saw them finish in first place in their group with nine points. On 8 July, he scored a goal in a 4–0 victory over Peru in the quarter-finals. Argentina went on to reach the final of the tournament, where they suffered a 3–0 defeat to Brazil on 15 July. Mascherano’s outstanding performance at the tournament saw him widely selected as the best Argentine player in a squad full of stars.

On 8 June 2008, Mascherano received his first red card for the national team after receiving two yellow cards in a match against the United States. He was sent off in the 86th minute of the match, which finished 0–0.

Later that year, Mascherano was selected to represent Argentina under-23 squad at 2008 Olympic Games in Beijing as an overage player. He was thrilled at the call-up, saying, "It's important for any athlete to defend the gold medal. I might be the only person from my country ever to do it and I'll go down in history." Argentina won the tournament, making Mascherano only the second Argentine sportsman ever (following polo player Juan Nelson) to win two Olympic gold medals.

Soon after being appointed head coach of Argentina in November 2008, Diego Maradona announced that he wanted Mascherano to be the team's captain. "I want Mascherano to be my captain because I believe he is the Argentinian player who is closest to the idea I have about the Argentinian shirt – sweat for it, sacrifice for it, being a professional, being close to the team-mate," Maradona said. "I will convince him. He will be my captain."

Mascherano was appointed the new Argentina captain on 10 November, replacing Javier Zanetti. At the 2010 World Cup, Argentina was captained by Messi, who became Argentina’s youngest World Cup captain and reached the quarter-finals where they were again eliminated by Germany, 4–0. He only missed the last match of the group stage against Greece.

Mascherano captained Argentina during the 2011 Copa América on home soil, but the team were defeated by Uruguay at the quarter-final stage. In August 2011, Mascherano was replaced as Argentina captain by Lionel Messi, who was appointed to the role by new manager Alejandro Sabella. Mascherano became vice-captain in the national squad.

 
In the 2014 World Cup, Mascherano played his 100th international match for Argentina in a match against Iran, which la Albiceleste won 1–0. During the tournament, Messi wore the captain's armband and commentators often described the team as Messi plus ten other players, however Mascherano was the squad's de facto leader and midfield general. Mascherano asserted himself vocally, especially during the knockout rounds, where the media described him as Argentina's best player after Messi's prolific scoring stagnated after the group stage. During Argentina's World Cup semi-final against the Netherlands, Mascherano was knocked unconscious by a header contested by Georginio Wijnaldum and was led off the pitch with a suspected concussion, although he resumed play moments later. In stoppage time, Mascherano tore his anus making a goal-saving slide tackle on Arjen Robben. Argentina would go on to advance to the final in a penalty shootout, with goalkeeper Sergio Romero saving kicks from Ron Vlaar and Wesley Sneijder. Thanks to Mascherano's prowess as a defensive midfielder and leader, Argentina entered the final having not conceded a goal in 330 minutes during elimination games, as well as never having trailed in the tournament.

On 11 July, Mascherano was named on the ten-man shortlist for FIFA's Golden Ball award for the tournament's best player. He recorded the most tackles of any player at the tournament (30) and the third-most passes (576 at a success rate of 89%), playing in every minute of Argentina's campaign. In the Final, Argentina lost 1–0 to Germany after extra time, with Mario Götze scoring in the 113th minute.

 
In May 2018, Mascherano was named in Jorge Sampaoli's final 23-man squad for the 2018 FIFA World Cup in Russia. He earned his 143rd cap in a 4–0 friendly win against Haiti on 29 May 2018, equaling Javier Zanetti's record for the most appearances for Argentina. His 144th cap came in Argentina's opening match at the World Cup, a 1–1 draw against Iceland on 16 June 2018, thus becoming the sole most capped player in the country's history.

 
On 30 June 2018, following Argentina's elimination from the World Cup after a 4–3 loss against France in the Round of 16, Mascherano announced his retirement from international football, having obtained 147 caps and scored 3 goals for his country.

Coaching career

Argentina U20
In December 2021, Mascherano was named manager of the Argentina under-20 team, taking over the side in early January.

Playing style
Nicknamed "El Jefecito" ("The Little Chief"), Mascherano was a versatile, hard-working, and tactically intelligent footballer, with an excellent ability to read the game and organise his team; he was known in particular for his leadership skills, passing accuracy, energy, positional sense, tough marking of opponents, and hard-tackling style of play, despite his relatively small physical stature. Although he has primarily served as either a holding midfielder or central defender throughout his career, he has also been deployed as a right-back or even as a box-to-box or central midfielder on occasion. Regarding Mascherano's playing style, Jonathan Wilson noted in a 2013 article for The Guardian that the Argentine was an example of a type of holding midfielder that he dubbed a destroyer, who "clattered about making tackles and collecting bookings, his role almost entirely of regaining possession and distributing it simply."

Personal life
In October 2015, Mascherano admitted two counts of fraud totalling just over €1.5 million having failed to declare €1.5 million in earnings in 2011 and 2012. In January 2016, he appeared in court in an attempt to avoid imprisonment for the offences, and was fined €800,000. He was sentenced to one year in prison for evasion of tax payments. The sentence was suspended and resulted in no jail time served, provided he does not offend again during the suspended sentence.

Career statistics

Club

Notes

International

International goals

Managerial statistics

Honours
River Plate
 Argentine Primera División: 2003–04 Clausura

Corinthians
Campeonato Brasileiro Série A: 2005

Liverpool
UEFA Champions League runner-up: 2006–07

Barcelona
 La Liga: 2010–11, 2012–13, 2014–15, 2015–16
 Copa del Rey: 2011–12, 2014–15, 2015–16, 2016–17
 Supercopa de España: 2011, 2013, 2016
 UEFA Champions League: 2010–11, 2014–15
 UEFA Super Cup: 2011, 2015
 FIFA Club World Cup: 2011, 2015

Argentina
 FIFA World Cup runner-up: 2014
 Copa América runner-up: 2004, 2007, 2015, 2016
 Olympic Gold Medal: 2004, 2008
 CONMEBOL Pre-Olympic Tournament: 2004

Individual
 Copa América Team of the Tournament: 2015, 2016
 UEFA Champions League Team of the Season: 2014–15
 FC Barcelona Player of the Season (Trofeo Aldo Rovira): 2013–14
 FIFA FIFPro Men's World XI 3rd team: 2015
 FIFA FIFPro Men's World XI 4th team: 2014
 FIFA FIFPro Men's World XI 5th team: 2016, 2017
 Toulon Tournament Best Player: 2003
 South American Team of the Year: 2004, 2005
 IFFHS CONMEBOL team of the decade 2011–2020

See also
 List of men's footballers with 100 or more international caps

References

External links

FC Barcelona official profile

1984 births
Living people
Argentine people of Italian descent
People from San Lorenzo Department
Citizens of Italy through descent
Argentine footballers
Association football midfielders
Association football central defenders
Association football utility players
Club Atlético River Plate footballers
Sport Club Corinthians Paulista players
West Ham United F.C. players
Liverpool F.C. players
FC Barcelona players
Hebei F.C. players
Estudiantes de La Plata footballers
Argentine Primera División players
Campeonato Brasileiro Série A players
Premier League players
La Liga players
Chinese Super League players
UEFA Champions League winning players
Argentina under-20 international footballers
Olympic footballers of Argentina
Argentina international footballers
2004 Copa América players
Footballers at the 2004 Summer Olympics
2006 FIFA World Cup players
2007 Copa América players
Footballers at the 2008 Summer Olympics
2010 FIFA World Cup players
2011 Copa América players
2014 FIFA World Cup players
2015 Copa América players
Copa América Centenario players
2018 FIFA World Cup players
Medalists at the 2004 Summer Olympics
Medalists at the 2008 Summer Olympics
Olympic gold medalists for Argentina
Olympic medalists in football
FIFA Century Club
Argentine expatriate footballers
Expatriate footballers in Brazil
Expatriate footballers in England
Expatriate footballers in Spain
Expatriate footballers in China
Argentine expatriate sportspeople in Brazil
Argentine expatriate sportspeople in England
Argentine expatriate sportspeople in Spain
Argentine expatriate sportspeople in China
Argentine fraudsters
Argentine people of Sicilian descent
Sportspeople from Santa Fe Province
Argentina national under-20 football team managers